Harry Perry Chappas (born October 26, 1957 in Mount Rainier, Maryland) is a former shortstop with the Chicago White Sox in parts of three seasons, from 1978 until 1980. Though he appeared in only 72 career games, he became a cult hero on the South Side due primarily to his stature. Chappas was measured by Harry Caray and publicly declared to be , an inch or two shorter than established star Freddie Patek.

Chappas' professional baseball career began with the barnstorming ex-Negro league Indianapolis Clowns, who had become racially integrated, and had developed into more of an entertainment product than a competitive team. When Chappas later made his major league debut, he became the final player and first white player to make the major leagues from a team formerly a member of the Negro leagues.

Chappas signed with the White Sox in 1976 as a sixth round draft pick. He impressed Veeck with good performances for the Appleton Foxes in 1978. This earned Chappas a September callup, during which he hit an effective .267 in 20 games.

Primarily due to his height, he gained more and more national interest, highlighted by an appearance on the cover of Sports Illustrated during spring training in 1979. In spring training that year, Chappas unseated veteran Don Kessinger and became the opening day shortstop. He lost his job after two weeks after missing a sign as a baserunner, only returning in September. Chappas made the opening day roster the following year as well, but only as a reserve player, and he was subsequently sent to the minors after hitting .160 in 50 at bats.

Overall, Chappas hit .245 in the majors and hit a single home run, off the Brewers' Bill Travers, in 1979.

References

External links
, or Retrosheet, or Pura Pelota

1957 births
Living people
Appleton Foxes players
American expatriate baseball players in Canada
American expatriate baseball players in Mexico
Baseball players from Maryland
Chicago White Sox players
Denver Bears players
Edmonton Trappers players
Glens Falls White Sox players
Indianapolis Clowns players
Iowa Oaks players
Knoxville Sox players
Major League Baseball shortstops
Miami Dade College alumni
Miami Dade Sharks baseball players
People from Mount Rainier, Maryland
Savannah Braves players
Sultanes de Monterrey players
Tigres de Aragua players
American expatriate baseball players in Venezuela